Filipo Toala (born 2 August 1973 in Apia) is a former Samoan rugby union player. He played as a wing.

Career
His first international cap was against Fiji, at Canberra, on 22 September 1998. He was part of the 1999 Rugby World Cup, playing one match. His last international cap was against Scotland, at Murrayfield, on 18 November 2000. He played in the NPC for Taranaki between 1997 and 1999. A year later, he moved to France, to play for Stade Rochelais, where he was nicknamed Le Tigre d'Apia (The Tiger of Apia). He ended his career in 2005, playing for Eastwood Rugby Club.

External links
Filipo Toala at New Zealand Rugby History

Filipo Toala at Rugby Rochelais

Sportspeople from Apia
Stade Rochelais players
Samoan rugby union players
Samoan expatriate sportspeople in France
Samoan expatriate sportspeople in New Zealand
Rugby union wings
Samoa international rugby union players
1976 births
Living people
Samoan expatriate sportspeople in Australia
Expatriate rugby union players in France
Expatriate rugby union players in New Zealand
Expatriate rugby union players in Australia
Samoan expatriate rugby union players
Taranaki rugby union players